Ligulariopsis is a genus of flowering plants in the groundsel tribe within the sunflower family.

Species
There is only one known species, Ligulariopsis shichuana, native to Gansu and Shaanxi Provinces in China.

References

Senecioneae
Monotypic Asteraceae genera
Endemic flora of China